Panthiades is a genus of butterflies in the family Lycaenidae. The species of this genus are found in the Neotropical realm.

Species
Panthiades aeolus  (Fabricius, 1775)
Panthiades bathildis  (C. & R. Felder, 1865)
Panthiades bitias  (Cramer, [1777])
Panthiades boreas  (C. & R. Felder, 1865)
Panthiades hebraeus  (Hewitson, 1867)
Panthiades ochus  (Godman & Salvin, [1887])
Panthiades paphlagon (C. & R. Felder, 1865)
Panthiades phaleros (Linnaeus, 1767)

References
, 1976: A review of the Hubnerian genera Panthiades and Cycnus (Lycaenidae: Eumaeini). Bulletin of the Allyn Museum 35: 1-13.

External links

Taxonomy, distribution and images of Panthiades bitias and Panthiades phaleros at Markku Savela's Lepidoptera and Some Other Life Forms

Eumaeini
Lycaenidae genera
Lycaenidae of South America
Taxa named by Jacob Hübner